is a Japanese male badminton player who plays at the Tonami badminton club since 2014.

Achievements

BWF World Junior Championships
Boys' Singles

BWF International Challenge/Series
Men's Singles

Men's Doubles

 BWF International Challenge tournament
 BWF International Series tournament
 BWF Future Series tournament

References

External links 
 

Living people
1991 births
Japanese male badminton players
Sportspeople from Miyazaki Prefecture
21st-century Japanese people